The following is a complete filmography of the actor Dan Castellaneta. Active since the 1980s, Castellaneta has appeared in numerous films, television series and video games. Along with his live-action work, he has often worked as a voice actor, including for his longest-running role as Homer Simpson in the animated sitcom The Simpsons. Castellaneta has also written six episodes of the show with his wife Deb Lacusta, and has won three Primetime Emmy Awards Outstanding Voice-Over Performance for it.

Live-action filmography

Film

Television
{| class="wikitable sortable"
|-
! Year
! Title
! Role
! class="unsortable" | Notes
|-
| 1987–1990
| The Tracey Ullman Show
| Various characters
| Recurring role
|-
| rowspan="3"| 1990
| ALF
| Steve Michaels
| Episode: "Stayin' Alive"
|-
| Bagdad Café
| Gilbert
| Episode: "Rainy Days and Mondays"
|-
| Working Tra$h
| George Agrande
| Television film
|-
| 1990, 1992
| Married... with Children
| Pete, Funeral Director
| Episodes: "Dance Show" and "Death of a Shoe Salesman"
|-
| rowspan="2"|1991
| Dream On
| Phil
| Episode: "The 37-Year Itch"
|-
| Sibs
| Warren Morris
| Recurring role
|-
| rowspan="2"|1992
| Lady Against the Odds
| Len Chisholm
| Television film
|-
| L.A. Law
| David Champion
| Episode: "L.A. Lawless"
|-
| 1993
| Tracey Ullman Takes on New York
| Gordon
| Television special
|-
| rowspan="5"| 1994
| Wings
| George Wexler
| Episode: "Moonlighting"
|-
| The George Carlin Show
| Passenger
| Episode: "George Gets Some Money"
|-
| Related by Birth
| Warren Morris
| Television film
|-
| Bakersfield P.D.
| Darian Ferguson
| Episode: "Last One Into the Water"
|-
| Grace Under Fire
| Mr. Rudder
| Episode: "Jimmy's Girl"
|-
| rowspan="2"|1995
| Murphy Brown
| Tony Lucchesi
| Episode: "Specific Overtures"
|-
| The Computer Wore Tennis Shoes
| Alan Winsdale
| Television film
|-
| rowspan="2"|1996
| Friends
| The Zoo Keeper
| Episode: "The One After the Super Bowl: Part 1"
|-
| NYPD Blue
| Gus
| Episode: "Head Case"
|-
| rowspan="2"|1997
| Cybill
| DaVolio
| Episode: "Kiss Me, You Fool"
|-
| The Drew Carey Show
| Stan
| Episode: "Two Drews and the Queen of Poland"
|-
| 1998
| Rhapsody in Bloom
| Chelton
| Television film
|-
| 1998–2001
| Everybody Loves Raymond
| Bryan
| Episodes: "T-Ball" and "It's Supposed to Be Fun"
|-
| rowspan="3"|1999
| Mad About You
| Rory O'Grady
| Episode: "Win a Free Car"
|-
| Oh, Grow Up
| Sven Jorgensen
| Episode: "Hunter's Metamorphosis"
|-
| Nash Bridges
| Eddie Day
| Episode: "Crosstalk"
|-
| rowspan=2|2001
| Yes, Dear
| Walt
| Episode: "Where There's a Will, There's a Waiver"
|-
| Laughter on the 23rd Floor
| Milt Fields
| Television film
|-
| 2002–2003
| Reba
| Eugene Fisher
| Episodes: "Mommy Nearest" and "The Feud"
|-
| rowspan="3"|2003
| The Pitts
| Morty
| Episode: "Dummy and Dummier"
|-
| Frasier
| Brad
| Episode: "Maris Returns"
|-
| That '70s Show
| Agent Armstrong
| Episode: "I'm Free"
|-
| rowspan="3"|2004
| Party Wagon
| Wild Bill Hickok, Clerk, Cheyenne #2
| Television film
|-
| Behind the Camera: The Unauthorized Story of 'Charlie's Angels'''
| Aaron Spelling
| Television film
|-
| Complete Savages| Frog / Mr. Horner
| Episode: "Free Lily"
|-
| rowspan="2"|2005
| Stargate SG-1| Joe Spencer
| Episode: "Citizen Joe"
|-
| Arrested Development| Dr. Stein
| Episode: "The Sword of Destiny"
|-
| rowspan="2"|2006
| The Jeff Garlin Program| Ted
| Television film
|-
| Veronica Mars| Dr. Kinny
| Episode: "My Big Fat Greek Rush Week"
|-
| 2006–2007
| Campus Ladies| Dean Dewey
| Episodes: "Safety Bathroom" and "Safety First"
|-
| rowspan="2"|2007
| Sands of Oblivion| Cecil B. DeMille
| Television film
|-
| Entourage| Andrew Preston
| Episodes: "The First Cut Is the Deepest" and "The Day Fuckers"
|-
| 2007–2011
| Greek| Dr. Milton Hastings
| 9 episodes
|-
| rowspan=3|2008
| Monk| Tiny Werner
| Episode: "Mr. Monk Goes to the Bank"
|-
| Reno 911!| Commissioner Jerry Salerno
| Episode: "Junior Runs for Office"
|-
| Relative Stranger| Gary
| Television film
|-
| rowspan="5"|2009
| Castle| Judge Markway
| Episodes: "Pilot" and "Ghosts"
|-
|Ghost Whisperer| Frank the Ghost
| Episode: "This Joint's Haunted"
|-
| How I Met Your Mother| Milt
| Episode: "Right Place, Right Time"
|-
| Bones| Officer Novarro
| Episode: "The Dwarf in the Dirt"
|-
| Desperate Housewives| Jeff Bicks
| Episode: "Boom Crunch"
|-
| rowspan="3"|2010
| Tracey Ullman's State of the Union| Agent
| Episode #3.5
|-
| The Good Guys| Walter Diparko
| Episode: "Hunches & Heists"
|-
| The Simpsons 20th Anniversary Special – In 3-D! On Ice!| Himself
| Television special
|-
| 2011
| Parks and Recreation| Derry Murbles
| 3 episodes
|-
| 2012
| The Office| CEO of Prestige Direct Sale Solutions
| Episode: "Turf War"
|-
| rowspan="4"|2013
| Major Crimes| Ray Winters
| Episode: "Year-End Blowout"
|-
| Dads| British Narrator
| Episode: "Pilot"
|-
| The Mindy Project| Marty
| Episode: "Danny's Friend"
|-
| Wendell & Vinnie| Mr. Lipshitz
| Minor role
|-
| rowspan="3"|2014
| The League| Dr. Harvat
| Episode: "Taco Standard Time"
|-
| Quick Draw| Deacon Jim
| Episode: "Deacon Jim"
|-
| Hot in Cleveland| Dr. McNally
| Episode: "Straight Outta Cleveland"
|-
| rowspan="3"|2015
| The Unauthorized Beverly Hills, 90210 Story| Aaron Spelling
| Television film
|-
| The Unauthorized Melrose Place Story| Aaron Spelling
| Television film
|-
| Baby Daddy| Peter Oliver
| Episode: "What Happens in Vegas"
|-
| 2019
| Merry Happy Whatever| Ted Boseman
| 2 episodes
|-
| 2022
| 9-1-1: Lone Star| Patrick Sr.
| Episode #3.13 
|}

Voice-over filmography
Film

Television

Video games

Music videos

Theme parks

Theater

Notes

References
 
 Dan Castellaneta at Variety''

Male actor filmographies
American filmographies